Abe or ABE may refer to:

People and fictional characters
 Shinzo Abe (1954–2022), former Prime Minister of Japan
 Abe (given name), a list of people and fictional characters with the given name or nickname
 Abe (surname), a list of people and fictional characters with the surname
 Abe clan, a Japanese clan

Languages
 Abé language, a language of the Niger-Congo family
 abe, the ISO 639-3 code for the Western Abenaki language, a nearly extinct Algonquian language of Canada and the United States
 AbE, Aboriginal English spoken in Australia

Science and technology
 Bolivian Space Agency, Agencia Boliviana Espacial
 Associação Brasileira de Estatística, a Brazilian scientific society
 Acetone–butanol–ethanol fermentation, or ABE fermentation, a process that produces acetone, biobutanol, and bioethanol from starch
 Attribute-based encryption, a collusion-resistant one-to-many encryption scheme

Storms
 Typhoon Abe (1990)
 Typhoon Abe (1993)

Transportation
 Abe Station, a railway station in Yazu Town, Yazu District, Tottori, Japan
 ABE, the Amtrak code for Aberdeen station (Maryland) in Maryland, US
 ABE, the IATA code for Lehigh Valley International Airport, Pennsylvania, US
 ABE, the MTR code for Aberdeen station (MTR) in Hong Kong, China
 ABE, the National Rail code for Aber railway station in Wales, UK

Other uses
 Abe River, Shizuoka Prefecture, Japan
 Abe (musical), a 2009 musical about Abraham Lincoln
 Adelaide Blue Eagles, an Australian football club
 Adult Basic Education, sustained adult engagement to learn new knowledge or skills
 Aviation boatswain's mate, equipment, a United States Navy occupational rating
 Old Abe (1861–1881), a bald eagle, the mascot of the 8th Wisconsin Volunteer Regiment in the American Civil War

See also
 AbeBooks, an online marketplace for books